The Crime Victim Compensation and Support Authority is a Swedish government agency which provides compensation and support for victims of crime. It is located in Umeå and has nationwide responsibility for three areas:

Victim injury compensation
If the offenders have no ability to pay damages and if there is no insurance for the damage, the victim may be entitled to Victim injury compensation of state resources. The right may exist even if the perpetrator is unknown. The allowance compensates primarily personal injury and violation.

Victims Fund
The fund is distributed for research and other victim-oriented projects driven in a non-profit, public or private. The fund is built up mainly by a special fee of 800 SEK each convicted person must pay if the offense can be punished with imprisonment. Distributed annually about 30 million from the Fund.

Learning Center
Victim Agency will gather and disseminate information and research to help improve treatment and treatment of victims. It is bl. a. the information to other authorities, NGOs and victims. Brottsoffermyndigheten also arranges conferences, theme days and courses.

See also
Crime in Sweden

References

External links
Crime Victim Compensation and Support Authority (English)

Law enforcement agencies of Sweden
Crime in Sweden
Compensation for victims of crime